The Force India VJM04 is a Formula One racing car developed by Force India for the 2011 Formula One season, the fourth car the team has made since entering the sport in 2008. The car was driven by long-time Force India driver Adrian Sutil and 2010 Deutsche Tourenwagen Masters champion Paul di Resta. The car was launched online on 8 February 2011.

Adrian Sutil
Sutil scored ninth in the first race of the season in Australia after the Saubers were disqualified. He failed to score until the race in Monaco where at one point, he was running fourth. However, on lap 72, contact with Pastor Maldonado and the wall triggered an incident in which Jaime Alguersuari and Vitaly Petrov crashed and the race was red-flagged. After the restart, Sutil eventually finished seventh. In Canada he suffered a drive-through penalty before retiring as a result of accident damage.

Paul di Resta
Di Resta scored points in his first and second Grands Prix in Australia and Malaysia whilst in China he qualified a career best eighth but failed to finish in the points. Turkey saw his first non-finish whilst Spain and Monaco brought no points. In Canada, he was running fifth at one point but ran into the back of Nick Heidfeld at the final chicane, breaking his front wing before receiving a drive-through penalty. He then crashed out of the race with a mistake in the wet conditions.

Complete Formula One results
(key) (results in bold indicate pole position; results in italics indicate fastest lap)

 Driver failed to finish the race, but was classified as they had completed >90% of the race distance.

References

External links

Force India Formula One cars